Beside Yourself is the seventeenth album (and third collection of outtakes) by the Australian psychedelic rock band The Church, released in October 2004. It consists of material recorded during the sessions for their 2003 album Forget Yourself and was only released in Australia, with a limited pressing of 500 copies. Some of the tracks had already been made available in the United States on the iTunes Exclusive Tracks EP and on the bonus disc given away with the U.S. release of Forget Yourself.

Track listing
All songs written by Kilbey/Koppes/Powles/Willson-Piper
"Jazz" – 4:57
"Hitspacebar" – 3:03
"Crash/Ride" – 5:29
"Moodertronic" – 4:17
"Tel Aviv" – 3:03
"Nervous Breakthrough" – 4:17
"The Illusion Mysteries" – 4:40
"Cantilever" – 9:43
"Serpent Easy" – 14:46

The tracks "Serpent Easy", "Cantilever" and "Moodertronic" are available on the bonus disc given away with the US-only release of Forget Yourself.

Personnel 

Steve Kilbey – lead vocals, bass guitar, keyboards, guitar
Peter Koppes – guitars, keyboards, bass guitar, backing vocals
Tim Powles – drums, percussion, backing vocals
Marty Willson-Piper – guitars, bass guitar, backing vocals

The Church (band) albums
2004 compilation albums
Cooking Vinyl compilation albums